Go Aish Adventure Park was a theme park in Karachi, Sindh, Pakistan, adjacent to Safari Park, Karachi inaugurated by Governor Sindh Dr. Ishrat Ul Ebad Khan. The park is permanently closed.  

The park consists of Ropes Course, Paintballing, Quad Biking, Indoor climbing and Mini golfing sections.

See also 
 List of parks and gardens in Pakistan
 List of parks and gardens in Lahore
 List of parks and gardens in Karachi

References

External links
 Official Website
 GoAish Junior
 GoAish at Wikimapia

Parks in Karachi
Amusement parks in Pakistan
Adventure parks